Lithocarpus neorobinsonii is a species of plant in the family Fagaceae. It is a tree endemic to Peninsular Malaysia.

References

neorobinsonii
Endemic flora of Peninsular Malaysia
Trees of Peninsular Malaysia
Near threatened flora of Asia
Taxonomy articles created by Polbot
Taxa named by Aimée Antoinette Camus